William Godfrey was an English Roman Catholic cardinal.

William Godfrey may also refer to:

Baronets
Sir William Godfrey, 1st Baronet (1739–1817), MP for Tralee and Belfast
Sir William Godfrey, 3rd Baronet (1797–1873), Anglo-Irish aristocrat and landowner
Sir William Cecil Godfrey, 5th Baronet (1857–1926), of the Godfrey baronets
Sir William Maurice Godfrey, 7th Baronet (1909–1971), of the Godfrey baronets
Sir William Wellington Godfrey (1880–1952), British general

Others
 William Godfrey, one pseudonym used by Sam Youd (1922–2012), known best as John Christopher
W. G. Godfrey (1941–2008), Canadian historian
William Godfrey (bishop) (born 1948), Anglican Bishop of Uruguay and of Peru

See also
Godfrey (name)